Theo Ogbidi (born 2 February 2001) is a German footballer who plays as a forward for 1. FC Lokomotive Leipzig.

Career statistics

Club

Notes

References

2001 births
Sportspeople from Halle (Saale)
Living people
German footballers
Association football forwards
3. Liga players
Regionalliga players
RB Leipzig players
1. FC Magdeburg players
Chemnitzer FC players
1. FC Lokomotive Leipzig players